Diana Rodger (born Diana Gregory, died 1986) was an Australian socialite and TV personality. She was a panel member on the Channel 7 program Beauty and the Beast during the 1960s.

During the 1960 & 70s Diana Rodger was a socialite, appearing at parties and was well known for her photographs in the Sydney, Australia newspapers' social and fashion sections. Appearing in many parades and catwalk shows in Australia's most famous locations and department stores.

She started her career as a mannequin and model, and a contender for the Miss Australia title. She was awarded Mannequin of the Year as well as many other awards and became one of the most popular and sought after photographic and catwalk mannequins in Australia.

She appeared in the theatre before becoming a TV personality during the 1960s by appearing on the Channel 7 program Beauty and the Beast, as a panel member whilst Eric Baume was the beast. She later went on to run a promotions agency.

Family
Diana was twice married (Donald Kirk & John Rodger) and dated the Australasian Managing Director for Rothmans. She bought a house in Connell's Point, Sydney, New South Wales, Australia.

Diana had three children - two boys (Greg Kirk - deceased and John Rodger) and a daughter (Sarah Watson).

Diana and the children remained at Connell's Point until her death in the 1980s, where her son John and his wife Catherine purchased the house from the estate and still live there today.

Australian television presenters
Australian women television presenters
1986 deaths
Year of birth missing